This is a list in alphabetical order of cricketers who have played for Colombo Cricket Club in first-class matches. Where there is an article, the link comes before the club career span, and the scorecard name (typically initials and surname) comes after. If no article is present, the scorecard name comes before the span.

A
 Lasith Abeyratne (2013–14 to 2022–23) : L. Abeyratne
 R. S. Abeysekera (1980–81)
 E. S. Abeysinghe (2005–06 to 2008–09)
 E. B. Alexander (1897–98)
 H. S. H. Alles (1997–98)
 G. H. Alston (1892–93)
 K. N. Amalean (1987–88)
 Malinga Amarasinghe (2022 to 2022–23) : A. M. E. M. Amarasinghe
 L. Amarasinghe (1990–91 to 1993–94)
 I. Amithakeerthi (1997–98)
 I. Anthony (1994–95)
 Roshan Anurudda (2014–15 to 2016–17) :  P. S. R. Anurudda
 S. D. C. Aravinda (2014–15)
 Duncan Arnolda (1997–98 to 2002–03) :  D. F. Arnolda
 V. Arunprakash (2004–05 to 2005–06)
 D. N. A. Athulathmudali (2012–13 to 2013–14)

E
 Bradman Ediriweera (1995–2003) : P. B. Ediriweera

References

Colombo Cricket Club